Maarten van Dulm (4 August 1879 – 25 April 1949) was a vice-admiral of the Royal Dutch Navy and Olympic fencer.

Van Dulm participated at the 1924 and 1928 Summer Olympics, in the single and team sabre competition and the team sabre competition respectively. He won a bronze medal in the team sabre competition in 1924.

Van Dulm joined the Royal Netherlands Navy in 1900 and was editor of the naval newspaper (Marineblad) from 1919 to 1922. He became a commander in 1924 and would eventually rise to the rank of vice-admiral. He was commander in chief of the Dutch East-India fleet from 1934-1936.

Honours 
Knight of the order of the Netherlands Lion
Commander of the order of Orange-Nassau

References

External links
 

1879 births
1949 deaths
Dutch male fencers
Olympic fencers of the Netherlands
Fencers at the 1924 Summer Olympics
Fencers at the 1928 Summer Olympics
Olympic bronze medalists for the Netherlands
Olympic medalists in fencing
Sportspeople from Arnhem
Medalists at the 1924 Summer Olympics